Demyan Serhiyovych Korotchenko (29 November 1894 – 7 April 1969) was a Ukrainian and Soviet politician, who twice served as the head of government of the Ukrainian SSR (the equivalent of today's prime-minister).

Biography
Demyan Korotchenko was born in to a peasant family in a small village that today is in Sumska Oblast, eastern Ukraine. He joined the Russian Communist Party (b) in 1918 and became active in organising Red Army detachments. He was a minor party official in Ukraine during the 1920s, until 1928, when the boss of the Ukrainian communist party, Lazar Kaganovich, was recalled and put in charge of the Moscow party regional communist party, Korotchenko was also transferred to take a two course, before being made chairman of the local soviet in the Bauman district of Moscow, where Nikita Khrushchev was the district party secretary. In 1935, he succeeded Khrushchev as the district party secretary. He achieved rapid promotion during the Great Purge, becoming First Secretary of the communist party in the Western Oblast, based in Smolensk, after the previous first secretary had been arrested. In 1938, when Khrushchev took over as party boss in Ukraine, Korotchenko was appointed First Secretary of the Dnipropetrovsk regional party committee, and then Chairman of the Ukrainian Council of Ministers. He helped organise partisan resistance when Ukraine was under German occupation in 1941-44. In July 1946, he was appointed a secretary of the party, but reverted to his former post as head of the Ukrainian government in December 1947. From January 1954, he held the largely ceremonial post Chairman of the Ukrainian Supreme Soviet, ie 'President' of Ukraine until his death.

Personality 
Khrushchev's biographer, William Taubman, described Korotchenko as a "classic yes-man". Reportedly, "Silence was his trump card. He would wait until (Khrushchev) made some sort or proposal, and then say: "Yes, yes, of course, that's exactly right."

Awards
 Hero of Socialist Labour (1964)
 Six Orders of Lenin
 Order of Suvorov, 1st class
 Order of the Patriotic War, 1st class

References

1894 births
1969 deaths
People from Sumy Oblast
People from Chernigov Governorate
Ukrainian people in the Russian Empire
Politburo of the Central Committee of the Communist Party of the Soviet Union members
Politburo of the Central Committee of the Communist Party of Ukraine (Soviet Union) members
Presidium of the Supreme Soviet
First convocation members of the Soviet of the Union
Second convocation members of the Soviet of the Union
Third convocation members of the Soviet of the Union
Fourth convocation members of the Soviet of Nationalities
Fifth convocation members of the Soviet of Nationalities
Sixth convocation members of the Soviet of Nationalities
Seventh convocation members of the Soviet of Nationalities
Communist Party of Ukraine (Soviet Union) politicians
Head of Presidium of the Verkhovna Rada of the Ukrainian Soviet Socialist Republic
Chairpersons of the Council of Ministers of Ukraine
First convocation members of the Verkhovna Rada of the Ukrainian Soviet Socialist Republic
Second convocation members of the Verkhovna Rada of the Ukrainian Soviet Socialist Republic
Third convocation members of the Verkhovna Rada of the Ukrainian Soviet Socialist Republic
Fourth convocation members of the Verkhovna Rada of the Ukrainian Soviet Socialist Republic
Fifth convocation members of the Verkhovna Rada of the Ukrainian Soviet Socialist Republic
Sixth convocation members of the Verkhovna Rada of the Ukrainian Soviet Socialist Republic
Governors of Dnipropetrovsk Oblast
Mayors of Dnipro
Heroes of Socialist Labour
Recipients of the Order of Lenin
Recipients of the Order of Suvorov, 1st class
21st-century Ukrainian politicians